The Emoji Movie is a 2017 American computer-animated science fiction comedy film produced by Columbia Pictures and Sony Pictures Animation, and distributed by Sony Pictures Releasing. The film was directed by Tony Leondis from a screenplay he co-wrote with Eric Siegel and Mike White, based on a story by Leondis and Siegel. It stars the voices of T.J. Miller, James Corden, Anna Faris, Maya Rudolph, Steven Wright, Jennifer Coolidge, Jake T. Austin, Christina Aguilera, Sofía Vergara, Sean Hayes, and Sir Patrick Stewart. Based on emojis, the film centers on a multi-expressional emoji Gene (Miller), who exists in a digital city Textopolis for smartphone owned by Alex (Austin), embarking on a journey to become a normal emoji capable of only a single expression, accompanied by his friends, Hi-5 (Corden) and Jailbreak (Faris). During their travels through the other apps, the trio must saved their world from total destruction before it was reset for functionality.

Inspired by Leondis' love of Toy Story (1995), the film was fast tracked into production in July 2015 after the bidding war and the project was officially announced in April 2016 as originally titled EmojiMovie: Express Yourself. Most of the lead cast members were hired throughout the rest of the year. The Emoji Movie was the fastest production time for two years, unlike most other animated films. The marketing of the film drew a negative response from the public and an internet backlash, before the film's release.

The Emoji Movie premiered on July 23, 2017 at the Regency Village Theatre and was theatrically released in the United States five days later. The film was a commercial success after grossing $217 million worldwide against its $50 million production budget, but was universally lambasted by critics, who criticized its script, humor, use of product placement, tone, voice performances, lack of originality, and plot, with negative comparisons and similarities to other animated films, especially Wreck-It Ralph (2012), The Lego Movie (2014), and Inside Out (2015). The Emoji Movie was nominated for five awards at the 38th Golden Raspberry Awards, winning four. It is the first animated film to win in any of those categories. It is frequently cited as the worst film of 2017, as well as one of the worst animated movies ever made.

Plot

Gene is an emoji that lives in Textopolis, a digital city inside the phone of his user, a teenager named Alex. He is the son of two meh emojis named Mel and Mary and is able to make multiple expressions despite his parents' upbringing. His parents are hesitant about him going to work, but Gene insists so that he can feel useful. Upon receiving a text from his love interest Addie McCallister, Alex decides to send her an emoji. When Gene is selected, he panics, makes a panicked expression, and wrecks the text center. Gene is called in by Smiler, a smiley emoji and leader of the text center, who concludes that Gene is a "malfunction" and therefore must be deleted. Gene is chased by bots but is rescued by Hi-5, a once-popular emoji who has since lost his fame due to lack of use. He tells Gene that he can be fixed if they find a hacker, and Hi-5 accompanies him so that he can reclaim his fame.

Smiler sends more bots to look for Gene when she finds out that he has left Textopolis, as his actions have caused Alex to think that his phone needs to be fixed. Gene and Hi-5 come to a piracy app where they meet a hacker emoji named Jailbreak, who wants to reach Dropbox so that she can live in the cloud. The trio is attacked by Smiler's bots, but manage to escape into the game Candy Crush. Jailbreak reveals that Gene can be fixed in the cloud, and the group goes off into the Just Dance app. While there, Jailbreak is revealed to be a princess emoji who fled home after tiring of being stereotyped. They are once again attacked by bots, and their actions cause Alex to delete the Just Dance app. Gene and Jailbreak escape, but Hi-5 is taken along with the app and ends up in the trash.

Mel and Mary go searching for Gene and have a very lethargic argument. They make up in the Instagram app when Mel reveals that he, too, is a malfunction, explaining Gene's behavior. While traveling through Spotify, Jailbreak admits that she likes Gene just the way he is and that he should not be ashamed of his malfunction. The two start to fall in love and Gene silently debates his choice to change himself. They make it to the trash and rescue Hi-5, but are soon attacked by a bot upgraded with illegal malware. They evade it by entangling its arms and enter Dropbox, where they encounter a firewall. After many tries, the gang gets past it with a password being Addie's name and make it to the cloud, where Jailbreak prepares to reprogram Gene. Gene admits his feelings for Jailbreak, but she wishes to stick to her plan of venturing into the cloud, unintentionally causing Gene to revert to his apathetic programming out of heartbreak. Suddenly, the upgraded bot sneaks into the cloud and captures Gene, prompting Hi-5 and Jailbreak to go after him with a Twitter bird summoned by Jailbreak in her princess form.

As Smiler prepares to delete Gene, Mel and Mary arrive. Mel reveals to everyone that he is also a malfunction, prompting Smiler to threaten to delete him as well. Jailbreak and Hi-5 arrive and disable the bot, which falls on top of Smiler. Alex has since taken his phone to a store in hopes that a factory reset performed by technical support would restore his phone's functionality, which would entail total destruction of Gene's world should such operation complete. Out of desperation, Gene prepares to have himself texted to Addie, making numerous faces to express himself. Realizing that Addie received a text from him, Alex cancels the factory reset just as it nearly finishes, saving the emoji and finally getting to speak with Addie, who likes the emoji Alex sent. Gene accepts himself for who he is and is celebrated by all of the emojis.

In a mid-credits scene, Smiler has been relegated to the "loser lounge" with the other unused and forgotten emojis for her crimes, wearing numerous braces due to her teeth being chipped by the bot, and playing and losing a game of Go Fish.

Voice cast

 T.J. Miller as Gene Meh, an outsider "meh" emoji who can show multiple expressions
 James Corden as Hi-5, a hand emoji representing a high five signal
 Anna Faris as Jailbreak, a hacker emoji who is later revealed to be a princess emoji named Linda.
 Maya Rudolph as Smiler, a smiley emoji. As the original emoji, she is the systems supervisor of the text center.
 Steven Wright as Mel Meh, Gene's emoji father who is later revealed to have the same multi-expressionist condition as his son
 Jennifer Coolidge as Mary Meh, Gene's emoji mother
 Sir Patrick Stewart as Poop, a well-mannered poop emoji
 Christina Aguilera as Akiko Glitter, a "super cool" dancer that lives inside the Just Dance app
 Sofía Vergara as Flamenca, a flamenco dancer emoji
 Sean Hayes as Steven, a devil emoji
 Rachael Ray as Spam, a spam message
 Jeff Ross as an Internet troll
 Jake T. Austin as Alex, a human teenager who owns the phone where Gene and his emoji friends live
 Tati Gabrielle as Addie McCallister, Alex's love interest
 Rob Riggle (uncredited) as an ice cream emoji
 Conrad Vernon as a Trojan Horse
 Tony Leondis as Laughter, Broom, and Pizza
 Liam Aiken as Ronnie Ramtech, one of the two programmers that select which Emoji to display on a phone

Production

Development
The film was inspired by director Tony Leondis' love of Toy Story (1995). Wanting to make a new take on the concept, he began asking himself, "What is the new toy out there that hasn't been explored?" At the same time, Leondis received a text message with an emoji, which helped him realize that this was the world he wanted to explore. In fleshing out the story, Leondis considered having the emojis visit the real world. However, his producer felt that the world inside a phone was much more interesting, which inspired Leondis to create the story of where and how the emojis lived. As Leondis is gay, he connected to Gene's plight of "being different in a world that expects you to be one thing", and in eventually realizing that the feeling held true for most people, Leondis has said the film "was very personal".

In July 2015, it was announced that Sony Pictures Animation had won a bidding war against Warner Bros. Pictures and Paramount Pictures over production rights to make the film, with the official announcement occurring at the 2016 CinemaCon. The film was fast tracked into production by the studio after the bidding war. Unlike most other animated films, the film had a production time of two years, as there were concerns that the movie would become outdated due to the evolution of phone technology.

Casting
On World Emoji Day on July 17, 2016, Miller was announced as the lead. Leondis created the part with Miller in mind, although the actor was initially hesitant to play the role, only accepting after Leondis briefed him on the story. Leondis chose Miller because "when you think of irrepressible, you think of TJ. But he also has this surprising ability to break your heart". in addition Miller also contributed some re-writes. In October 2016, it was announced that Ilana Glazer and Corden would join the cast as well. Glazer was later replaced by Anna Faris. According to Jordan Peele, he was initially offered the role of "Poop", which he would go on to state led to his decision to retire from acting. The part would ultimately go to Patrick Stewart.

Music
The film's score was composed by Patrick Doyle, who previously composed the score for Leondis' Igor (2008). Singer Ricky Reed recorded an original song, "Good Vibrations", for the film. While also voicing a character in the film, Christina Aguilera's song "Feel This Moment" was also used during the film and the end credits.

Marketing
On December 20, 2016, a teaser trailer for the film was released, which received overwhelming criticism from social media users, collecting almost 22,000 "dislikes" against 4,000 "likes" within the first 24 hours of its release. A second trailer was released on May 16, 2017, which also received an extremely negative reception. Sony promoted the release of the latter trailer by hosting a press conference in Cannes, the day before the 2017 Cannes Film Festival, which featured T. J. Miller parasailing in. Variety called the event "slightly awkward", and The Hollywood Reporter described it as "promotional ridiculousness".

Sony Pictures was later criticized after the film's official Twitter account posted a promotional picture of a parody of The Handmaid's Tale, featuring Smiler. The parody was considered to be "tasteless" due to the overall themes of the work, and the image was deleted afterward.

On July 17, 2017, the Empire State Building was lit "emoji yellow". That same day, director Tony Leondis and producer Michelle Raimo Kouyate joined Jeremy Burge and Jake T. Austin to ring the closing bell of the New York Stock Exchange and Saks Fifth Avenue hosted a promotional emoji red carpet event at its flagship store to promote branded Emoji Movie merchandise.

On July 20, 2017, Sony Pictures invited YouTuber Jacksfilms (whom they considered "the [No. 1] fan of the Emoji Movie") to the world premiere and sent him a package containing various Emoji Movie memorabilia including fidget spinners, face masks, and a plushie of the poop emoji. Jacksfilms had praised the movie four months prior, although it was sarcasm and he was actually making fun of the movie.

Release
The Emoji Movie premiered on July 23, 2017, at the Regency Village Theatre in Los Angeles. The film was originally scheduled for general release on August 11 and August 4, but it was moved up to July 28. In theaters, The Emoji Movie was accompanied by a short film Puppy! (2017)

The Emoji Movie was released on 4K Ultra HD Blu-ray, Blu-ray, and DVD on October 24, 2017, by Sony Pictures Home Entertainment. According to The Numbers, the domestic DVD sales are  $8,616,759 and the Blu-ray sales are $6,995,654.

Reception

Box office
The Emoji Movie grossed $86.1 million in the United States and Canada and $131.7 million in other territories, for a worldwide total of $217.8 million, against a production budget of $50 million.

The film was released on July 28, 2017. The Emoji Movie grossed $10.1 million on its first day, including $900,000 from Thursday night previews. The film debuted at second grossing $25.7 million from 4,075 theaters. Its second weekend earnings dropped by 50 percent to $12.4 million, and followed by another $6.5 million the third weekend. The Emoji Movie completed its theatrical run in the United States and Canada on November 30, 2017.

Review embargoes for the film were lifted midday July 27, only a few hours before the film premiered to the general public, in a move considered among several tactics studios are using to try to curb bad Rotten Tomatoes ratings. Speaking of the effect embargoing reviews until last minute had on the film's debut, Josh Greenstein, Sony Pictures president of worldwide marketing and distribution, said, "The Emoji Movie was built for people under 18 ... so we wanted to give the movie its best chance. What other wide release with a score under 8 percent has opened north of $20 million? I don't think there is one."

Critical response
The website's critics consensus reads a prohibitory symbol (🚫) in place of text. Metacritic (which uses a weighted average) assigned The Emoji Movie a score of 12 out of 100 based on 26 critics, indicating "overwhelming dislike", becoming the lowest-rated animated film on the site. Audiences polled by CinemaScore gave the film an average grade of "B" on an A+ to F scale.

David Ehrlich of IndieWire gave the film a D, writing: "Make no mistake, The Emoji Movie is very, very, very bad (we're talking about a hyperactive piece of corporate propaganda in which Spotify saves the world and Sir Patrick Stewart voices a living turd), but real life is just too hard to compete with right now." Alonso Duralde of TheWrap was also critical of the film, calling it "a soul-crushing disaster because it lacks humor, wit, ideas, visual style, compelling performances, a point of view or any other distinguishing characteristic that would make it anything but a complete waste of your time".

Glen Kenny of The New York Times described the film as "nakedly idiotic", stating that the film plays off a Hollywood idea that the "panderingly, trendily idiotic can be made to seem less so". Owen Gleiberman of Variety lambasted the film as "hectic situational overkill" and "lazy" while viciously criticizing the film, writing: "There have been worse ideas, but in this case the execution isn't good enough to bring the notion of an emoji movie to funky, surprising life." Writing in The Guardian, Charles Bramesco called the film "insidious evil" and wrote that it was little more than an exercise in advertising smartphone downloads to children. Reviewers like The Washington Post, The Guardian, the Associated Press, The New Republic, and the Hindustan Times also cited the film's negative comparisons and similarities to Inside Out (2015), Toy Story (1995), The Lego Movie (2014), Wreck-It Ralph (2012), and Bee Movie (2007), among others.

Nigel Andrews of the Financial Times, however, gave the film 3/5 stars, writing: "Occasionally it's as if The Lego Movie is reaching out a long, friendly arm to Inside Out and falling into the chasm between. But the film is inventive too", while Jake Wilson of The Sydney Morning Herald gave the film 4/5 stars, calling it "a rare attempt by Hollywood to come to grips with the online world".

Accolades
At the 38th Golden Raspberry Awards, The Emoji Movie received a nomination for The Razzie Nominee So Rotten You Loved It; and won Worst Picture, Worst Director, Worst Screen Combo, and Worst Screenplay. It became the first animated film to win in any of those categories.

Notes

See also
Postmodernist film
Criticism of capitalism
Internet culture

References

External links

 
 
 

2017 films
2017 computer-animated films
2010s American animated films
2010s science fiction comedy films
American buddy comedy films
American children's animated adventure films
American children's animated comic science fiction films
American children's animated science fantasy films
American computer-animated films
Film controversies
Advertising and marketing controversies in film
Animated buddy films
Columbia Pictures films
Columbia Pictures animated films
Emoji
Sony Pictures Animation films
Works set in computers
Films directed by Tony Leondis
Films scored by Patrick Doyle
Films with screenplays by Tony Leondis
Films with screenplays by Mike White
2010s buddy comedy films
2017 comedy films
Golden Raspberry Award winning films
2010s English-language films